Richard Siddoway Bagnall (14 July 1889, Winlaton near Whickham -19 January 1962) was an English entomologist who specialised in Thysanoptera. Bagnall worked on world fauna and described many new genera and species and wrote 1912 Some considerations regard to the classification of the order Thysanoptera. The Annals and Magazine of Natural History, 10 (55): 220-222 (1912) and Further considerations in regard to the classification of the order Thysanoptera. The Annals and Magazine of Natural History (ser.10), 5: 571-575 (1930) important works on the higher classification of the Thysanoptera.

References
Schliephake, G. & Strassen, R. (2005). Biographical Data on Thysanopterologists of the 20th century. Thysanoptera, Dehli (1) : 21-25   
Mound LA (1968). A review of R.S. Bagnall's Thysanoptera collections. Bulletin of the British Museum (Natural History) Entomology. 11 : 1–181

External links
Natural History Museum Archive

1889 births
1962 deaths
People from Winlaton
English entomologists
20th-century British zoologists